Western Cape is one of the nine multi-member constituencies of the National Assembly of South Africa, the lower house of the Parliament of South Africa, the national legislature of South Africa. The constituency was established in 1994 when the National Assembly was established by the Interim Constitution following the end of Apartheid. It is conterminous with the province of Western Cape. The constituency currently elects 23 of the 400 members of the National Assembly using the closed party-list proportional representation electoral system. At the 2019 general election it had 3,128,567 registered electors.

Electoral system
Western Cape currently elects 23 of the 400 members of the National Assembly using the closed party-list proportional representation electoral system. Constituency seats are allocated using the largest remainder method with a Droop quota.

Election results

Summary

Detailed

2019
Results of the 2019 general election held on 8 May 2019:

The following candidates were elected:
Alexandra Abrahams (DA), Michael Bagraim (DA), Jan de Villiers (DA), Richard Dyantyi (ANC), Dion George (DA), Bheki Hadebe (ANC), Faiez Jacobs (ANC), Kenneth Leonard Jacobs (ANC), Khaya Magaxa (ANC), Richard Majola (DA), Kobus Marais (DA), Zakhele Mbhele (DA), Hisamodien Mohamed (ANC), Thandi Mpambo-Sibhukwana (DA), Corné Mulder (VF+), Siphokuhle Patrein (ANC), Emma Powell (DA), Leon Schreiber (DA), Floyd Shivambu (EFF), Eleanore Spies (DA), Marie Sukers (ACDP), Okkie Terblanche (DA) and Benedicta van Minnen (DA).

2014
Results of the 2014 general election held on 7 May 2014:

The following candidates were elected:
Freddie Adams (ANC), Michael Bagraim (DA), Francois Beukman (ANC), Shahid Esau (DA), Archibold Figlan (DA), Tim Harris (DA), Geordin Hill-Lewis (DA), Chris Hunsinger (DA), Lungiswa Veronica James (DA), Wilmot James (DA), Bernard Joseph (EFF), Mziwamadoda Uppington Kalako (ANC), Zoe Kota-Fredericks (ANC), Andrew Frans Madella (ANC), Tandi Mahambehlala (ANC), Richard Majola (DA), Erik Marais (DA), Kobus Marais (DA), Mandisa Octovia Matshoba (ANC), Zakhele Mbhele (DA), Bongani Mkongi (ANC), James Selfe (DA) and Andricus van der Westhuizen (DA).

2009
Results of the 2009 general election held on 22 April 2009:

The following candidates were elected:
Buyiswa Cornelia Blaai (COPE), Ryan Coetzee (DA), Phillip Dexter (COPE), Mgolodi Moses Dikgacwi (ANC), Willem Doman (DA), Marius Fransman (ANC), Albert Fritz (DA), Johan Pieter Gelderblom (ANC), Mpumelelo Frederick Gona (ANC), Lance William Greyling (ID), Wilmot James (DA), Zoe Kota-Fredericks (ANC), Helen Lamoela (DA), Xoliswa Caroline Makasi (ANC), Kobus Marais (DA), David Maynier (DA), Masizole Mnqasela (DA), Linda Nellie Moss (ANC), Piet Pretorius (DA), Ebrahim Rasool (ANC), Denise Robinson (DA), James Selfe (DA) and Dene Smuts (DA).

2004
Results of the 2004 general election held on 14 April 2004:

The following candidates were elected:
Jonathan Doneley Arendse (ANC), Cecil Valentine Burgess (ID), Kent Diederich Skelton Durr (ACDP), Sarel Francois Haasbroek (DA), Avril Harding (ID), Rhoda Roaline Joemat (ANC), Bruce William Kannemeyer (ANC), Lawrence Daluxolo Maduma (ANC), Xoliswa Caroline Makasi (ANC), Helene Maree (DA), Petrus Meyer (NNP), Linda Nellie Moss (ANC), Maxwell Izekiel Moss (ANC), Daniel April Andrew Olifant (ANC), Sydney Edward Opperman (DA), Randy Desmond Pieterse (ANC), Pierre Rabie (DA), James Selfe (DA), Bulelwa Tinto (ANC), Kraai van Niekerk (DA) and Joselene Witbooi (NNP).

1999
Results of the 1999 general election held on 2 June 1999:

1994
Results of the 1994 general election held on between 26 and 29 April 1994:

References

National Assembly of South Africa constituencies
National Assembly of South Africa constituencies established in 1994
National Assembly constituency